Milano is a given name. Notable people with the name include:

Milano Koenders (born 1986), Dutch footballer